Lawh-i-Qad-Ihtaraqa'l-Mukhlisun, better known as the Fire Tablet, is a tablet written in Arabic by Baháʼu'lláh, founder of the Baháʼí Faith, in Akká  in 1871. Baháʼu'lláh wrote the tablet in response to questions by a Baháʼí believer from Iran. The authorized English translation was done in 1980 by Adib Taherzadeh and a Committee at the Baháʼí World Centre.

The tablet is written in rhyming verse, has the form of a conversation between Baháʼu'lláh and God, and reflects the sufferings of Baháʼu'lláh. Baháʼís often recite this tablet in times of difficulty.

See also
 Long Healing Prayer
 Tablet of Ahmad (Arabic)
 Tablet of the Holy Mariner
 Prayer in the Baháʼí Faith

Notes

Sources

Further reading
 Thomas, James B. (2002). An Exposition on the Fire Tablet of Baháʼu'lláh: (Lawh-i-Qad Ihtaraqa'l-Mukhlisún) in: Lights of Irfan, Book 3. Irfan Colloquia, Wilmette, USA. pp. 173–184.

1871 documents
Works by Baháʼu'lláh